Ceremonial is the second studio album by the American post-punk band Savage Republic, released in 1985 by Independent Project Records and Fundamental Records. It has been remixed and reissued, since 1990, accompanied by the Trudge EP. All CD issues contain only the instrumental versions of the songs.

Track listing

Personnel 
Adapted from the Ceremonial liner notes.

Savage Republic
 Mark Erskine – drums, percussion, bongos, vocals
 Thom Furhmann – trombone, bass guitar
 Greg Grunke – guitar, bass guitar, dulcimer
 Bruce Licher – guitar, bass guitar, percussion, vocals, production
 Robert Loveless – vocals, keyboards, mandolin, percussion, production
 Ethan Port – guitar, percussion, vocals

Additional musicians
 Louise Bialik – vocals (A1)
Production and additional personnel
 Mark Coffin – recording
 Scott Sing – photography
 Gary Stern – recording
 Evan Williams – recording, mixing

Release history

References

External links 
 

1985 albums
Savage Republic albums